Corio  is a surname of Italian origin. People with that name include:

Ann Corio (1909 – 1999), American burlesque performer and actress
Bernardino Corio (born 1459 – 1519), Italian humanist and historian of the Renaissance
Frankie Corio, actor in the 2022 film Aftersun
Girolamo Corio (died 1651), Italian Roman Catholic prelate and Bishop of Parma 
Silvio Corio (1875 − 1954), also called Crastinus, Italian anarchist

See also
 Corio (disambiguation)
 Coiro

Surnames of Italian origin